Ampe may refer to:

 Ampe (game), a Ghanaian children's game which involves jumping and clapping of hands.
 Gleichenia cryptocarpa, a fern with a natural distribution in Chile
 Lophosoria quadripinnata, a fern found in the Americas